Collective Defined Contribution pension schemes (CDCs) enable savers to pool their money into a single fund to share investment risk and longevity risk. Such schemes became popular in the Netherlands in the early 2000s. CDCs tend to have lower operating costs than smaller individual schemes.

The CDC fund pays a monthly or annual pension income. Pension incomes vary depending on the funding level of the CDC.

Advantages
Following a lengthy public consultation involving 70 contributors from the pension and insurance industry around the world, the United Kingdom Department for Work and Pensions concluded that CDCs offer the following advantages for consumers:

 They "provide savings and income in retirement option within one package that is potentially attractive to people who are uncomfortable making complex financial decisions at the point of retirement".
 They "enable the sharing of longevity risk between members, therefore providing each individual member with an element of longevity protection without the cost of accessing the insurance market".
 They "allow employers to offer their employees a pension scheme, which offers an income in retirement in the form of a pension from the scheme’s own assets, but without the risks and balance sheet impact of sponsoring a Defined benefit plan".

Disadvantages
The key risk facing CDCs is Intergenerational risk transfer where older members are paid too much relative to younger members or vice versa. Whilst many solutions have been proposed for managing this risk, a simple to understand and actuarially fair method to eliminate this risk is to segregate separate age group cohorts into mini-CDCs and to manage these groups as a Tontine.

Examples
Royal Mail Pension Scheme

See also
Tontines
Target Benefit

References

Pensions